Raid is a 2003 Finnish crime film directed by Tapio Piirainen. It is an adaptation of the 2000 television series of the same name (itself based on the novel series of the same name by Harri Nykänen). The screenplay was written by Nykänen and Piirainen.

Cast 
 Kai Lehtinen as Raid
 Mari Rantasila as Tarja
 Oiva Lohtander as Police Lieutenant Jansson
 Kirsti Väänänen as Sergeant Susisaari
 Pekka Huotari as Police Sergeant Huusko
 Juha Muje as Sundman
 Markku Maalismaa as Horseman (Ratsumies)
 Harry Baer as Mark Hollander
 Lia Boysen as Venla
 Jorma Tommila as French Foreign Legionary
 Seppo Kulmala as Ponytail (Poninhäntä)
 Erik Kiviniemi as Scarface (Arpinaama)

References

External links 
 
 

Finnish crime action films
2000s crime action films
Films based on Finnish novels
Films set in Helsinki
Films shot in Finland
Films shot in Sweden